This is a list of episodes for the television series Police Story.

Original series overview

Original series episodes

Season 1 (1973–74)

Season 2 (1974–75)

Season 3 (1975–76)

Season 4 (1976–77)

Season 5 (1977–78)

Specials (1979–87)

Revival series overview

Revival series episodes

References

External links
 
 Police Story at The Classic TV Archive

Lists of American crime drama television series episodes